PK or pk may refer to:

Arts and entertainment

Gaming
 Probability of kill (Pk), in computer games, simulations, models, and operations research
 Disney's PK: Out of the Shadows, a 2002 video game
 Player killing, player versus player conflict in MMORPGs and MUDs

Other media
 PK (film), a 2014 Indian film directed by Rajkumar Hirani and starring Aamir Khan
 Paperinik, a cartoon character
 Peacekeepers (Farscape), in the Farscape television show

Organisations
 Pakistan International Airlines (IATA airline code)
 Polyteknikkojen Kuoro, a Finnish academic male choir
 Promise Keepers, a Christian men's organization
 Swedish Publicists' Association, Swedish journalist organization

People
 P.K (producer), of the South Korean music production duo Future Bounce
 P. K. van der Byl (1923–1999), Rhodesian politician
 P. K. Subban (born 1989), hockey player
 Paul Kalkbrenner (born 1977), electronic musician
 Phil Katz (1962–2000), creator of the PKZIP file compression software
 Philip K. Wrigley (1894–1977), American chewing gum manufacturer
 Paul Kagame (born 1957), President of Rwanda
 Patricia Karvelas, Australian radio presenter, current affairs journalist and political correspondent

Places
 PK, or Busan–Gyeongnam Area, a metropolitan area in South Korea
 Pakistan (ISO country code)
 Possum Kingdom Lake, Texas, US
 Pickering, Ontario, Canada
 Peking, old name of Beijing

Science and technology

Chemistry and pharmacology
 pK, negative logarithm of the dissociation constant K (-logK)
 Pharmacokinetics, a branch of pharmacology dedicated to determining the fate of substances administered to a living organism

Computing
 PK, a magic number commonly used in the Zip file format
 .pk, the country code top level domain (ccTLD) for Pakistan
 Port knocking, a method of externally opening ports on a firewall
 Public-key cryptography

Other uses in science and technology
 PK machine gun, a Soviet weapon, abbreviated from Pulemyot Kalashnikova (Kalashnikov machine gun)
 Horsepower (Dutch abbreviation paardenkracht)
 Pentax K-mount, a camera lens mount
 Catalogue of galactic planetary nebulae (Perek-Kohoutek), in astronomy
 Renault PK, a car made by Pars Khodro between 2000 and 2005

Sports
 Parkour, the activity or sport of moving rapidly through an area, typically urban, negotiating obstacles by running, jumping, and climbing
 Penalty kick (association football)
 Penalty kill, in ice hockey
 Placekicker, in American football

Other uses
 Point kilométrique (English: Kilometric point), a measurement of distance travelled
 Preacher's kid, a child of a pastor
 SAS President Kruger (F150), a former ship of the South African Navy
 Psychokinesis, an alleged psychic ability allowing a person to influence objects without physical interaction
 Pre-kindergarten
 Indonesia (aircraft registration prefix PK)

See also
 Piquet, a trick-taking card game for two players